Andrews Wood, (near Modbury in Devon), is a nature reserve managed by the Devon Wildlife Trust.

It is also a 23.5 hectare biological Site of Special Scientific Interest, notified in 1952.

The site supports the largest colony of Heath Lobelia (Lobelia urens) in Great Britain.  In 2009, 9828 plants were recorded.

See also
List of Sites of Special Scientific Interest in Devon

References

Sites of Special Scientific Interest in Devon
Sites of Special Scientific Interest notified in 1952
Nature reserves in Devon
Forests and woodlands of Devon